Håkan Sandell (born 16 February 1962 in Västra Skrävlinge) is a Swedish poet.

Life and career
Håkan Sandell emerged in the 1980s as a member of Malmöligan, a group of poets based in Malmö, consisting of Sandell, Clemens Altgård, Per Linde, Kristian Lundberg, Lukas Moodysson and Martti Soutkari. Although diverse in style and subjects, the members were inspired by punk rock, the Danish poet Michael Strunge and differed from the politicised poetry that had dominated Sweden in the 1970s. The group disbanded in 1993 after which Sandell moved to Denmark, Ireland and eventually Norway.

In the 1990s, Sandell and Altgård wrote the pamphlet Om retrogardism ("on retrogardism"), in which they advocated a literature rooted in traditional expressions. Sandell has mentioned the painter Odd Nerdrum as an important influence for this direction away from modernism. The first Nerdrum painting he saw was Return of the Sun, through which he realised which qualities modernism was missing: "the pathetic, the heroic, the sentimental, the nostalgic, the decadent, the Luciferian, the declamatory, the dramatic, the Dantean! (Dantesque?), the Gothic, late Manierism, Romanticism, historicism, symbolism, etc."

A volume of Sandell's poetry titled Dog Star Notations: Selected Poems 1999 - 2016 appeared in English in 2016, translated by Bill Coyle and published by Carcanet Press.

Selected bibliography
 1981 – Cathy, poetry
 1982 – Europé, poetry
 1983 – En poets blod, poetry
 1984 – Efter sjömännen ; Elektrisk måne, poetry
 1986 – Johnny – en bokfilm, prose
 1988 – Flickor, poetry
 1990 – Skampåle, poetry
 1991 – Dikter för analfabeter, poetry
 1992 – Bestiarium, privat print
 1994 – Fröer och undergång, poetry
 1995 – Om retrogardism, pamphlet (with Clemens Altgård)
 1995 – Mikkel Rävs skatt
 1996 – Sjungande huvud, poetry
 1999 – Midnattsfresken, poetry
 2002 – Traditionens uppvaknande, essays
 2002 - Så som skymningen älskar dig, translations from Amanda Aizpuriete
 2003 – Oslo-Passionen, poetry
 2003 – Gåvor : valda dikter 1984-2002, poetry
 2004 – Begynnelser : en barndom i tjugotvå dikter, poetry
 2006 – Skisser till ett århundrade, poetry
 2009 – Gyllene dagar, poetry
 2012 – Jag erkänner att jag levde upp mitt liv, translations
 2013 – Ode till demiurgen, poetry

Accolades
 2004 – Kallebergerstipendiet from the Swedish Academy
 2007 – Sveriges Essäfonds pris from Föreningen för Sveriges Kulturtidskrifter
 2010 – De Nios Vinterpris from Samfundet De Nio

References

External links
 Presentation at the Swedish publisher's website 
 Presentation at the British publisher's website

1962 births
20th-century Swedish poets
21st-century Swedish poets
Writers from Malmö
Swedish male poets
Swedish-language poets
Living people
20th-century Swedish male writers
21st-century male writers